Stephen P. Karns is a Dallas-based civilian lawyer who specializes in defending U.S. military personnel in criminal cases in the U.S. military legal system. In 2004, Karns represented U.S. Army Reserve intelligence analyst Armin Cruz at the latter's trial for his role in the Abu Ghraib prisoner abuse scandal.

References

External links 
 Stephen Karns and Armin Cruz on CNN
 Stephen Karns on Fox News

Living people
American lawyers
Year of birth missing (living people)